Bungee balls were toys marketed as a means of enhancing a person's hand–eye coordination. At one end of an elastic bungee cord, the user slips their finger into a notch, and at the other end is an elastic hollow ball containing synthetic liquid. Throwing the ball thus causes it to return to one's hand.

Fashion and availability
Bungee balls were a fad in March 2003 and most bungee balls were sold during this time period. They were discontinued in many stores because often after about 4–7 hours of use, the bungee cord would snap, and the ball itself could also rupture, releasing synthetic liquid. Additionally, concerns developed that the cord could become wrapped around a child's neck while playing with it. By October 2003, nearly all bungee balls had vanished from retail stores, and are no longer sold.

See also
List of fads

References

External links
 Office Playground: Bungee Ball

2000s toys
Physical activity and dexterity toys
Balls